Indian parsley is a common name for several plants in the family Apiaceae and may refer to:

Aletes
Lomatium